The following is a list of authors of Macmillan Publishing

 Winston Churchill's novel Richard Carvel in 1899
 Thorstein Veblen The Theory of the Leisure Class in 1899
 Upton Sinclair's The Jungle in 1906
 Jack London's The Call of the Wild in 1903
 William Butler Yeats
 Rabindranath Tagore
 Liberty Hyde Bailey
 Francis Marion Crawford’s Saracinesca 
 Margaret Mitchell's Gone With the Wind in 1936  
 Rachel Field's All This, and Heaven Too in 1938
 Kathleen Winsor's Forever Amber in 1944    
 C. S. Lewis
 Marianne Moore
 Ayn Rand's book We the Living in 1936 
 Cathy Scott's The Murder of Biggie Smalls in 2001
 Doug Worgul's Thin Blue Smoke in 2009 
 Michael Stewart
 Elle and Blair Fowler, Beneath the Glitter and Where Beauty Lies in 2012 and 2013
 Judd Trichter, Love in the Age of Mechanical Reproduction in 2015

References 

Macmillan
Macmillan Publishing